Cross My Heart is the 21st novel in the Alex Cross series written by author James Patterson. The novel takes place after Alex Cross, Run, in which Alex tries contemplating a life outside the Metro Police after the apparent death of Ava, an orphan girl they took in. It was initially not planned by Patterson, but was later confirmed to be in the works. The novel once again features Metro Police detective Alex Cross. Cross My Heart was released 20 years after the original novel, Along Came a Spider. The novel's events, having ended on a cliffhanger, were continued in the next novel, Hope to Die.

Premise
Alex Cross has been a family man at heart—he loves his children, his grandmother, and his beautiful wife Brianna. Alex Cross has managed to stop serial killers and survive. But all of that is about to change. When a new enemy targets Cross and his family, Cross finds himself in a whole new game. If he tries to save his family or stop the killer, they die. Can Alex protect his family and capture a criminal at the same time?

Character list
Alex Cross, the series' protagonist who often deals with extreme murder cases, and has an overwhelming reputation to solve crimes. Cross is described as a family man, but also dedicated to his job and struggles keeping them balanced. 
John Sampson, Cross' best friend and fellow Metro cop. Sampson and Cross have been friends since they were children and is married to his wife Billie, and is extremely tall, at six foot seven and a half. 
Brianna Stone-Cross, Cross' wife and Metro-police cop, she also takes care of Cross' grandma and kids as if they were her own family. She is described as caring and gentle, but also a "stone" when it comes to police duty.
Nana Mama, who is still grieving over the death of Ava Williams, a girl whom they adopted in Kill Alex Cross, and died in Alex Cross, Run. She is Alex's grandmother, who took care of him after his parents' death.
Damon, Janelle, and Ali Cross, Alex's children.
Ava
Marcus Sunday/Thierry Mulch, the villain of the novel

Release
The novel was scheduled to be released on November 25, 2013 in hardcover and audio book, with the paperback to be presumably released in 2014. The release coincides with the 20th anniversary of the original novel.

Critical reception
The novel has received mostly positive reviews. Author of the Jack Reacher series, Lee Child, has given the novel a positive review, stating that "Behind all the noise and numbers, we shouldn't forget that no one gets this big without natural storytelling talent—which is what James Patterson has, in spades. The Alex Cross series proves that."

References

Alex Cross (novel series)
Novels set in Washington, D.C.
2013 American novels
Little, Brown and Company books